A s'more is a campfire treat popular in the United States and Canada, consisting of one or more toasted marshmallows and a layer of chocolate sandwiched between two pieces of graham cracker.

Etymology and origins
S'more is a contraction of the phrase "some more". S'more appeared in a cookbook in the early 1920s, where it was called a "Graham Cracker Sandwich". The text indicates that the treat was already popular with both Boy Scouts and Girl Scouts. In 1927, a recipe for "Some More" was published in Tramping and Trailing with the Girl Scouts. Newspaper recipes began appearing as early as 1925. 

The contracted term "s'mores" appears in conjunction with the recipe in a 1938 publication aimed at summer camps. A 1956 recipe uses the name "S'Mores", and lists the ingredients as "a sandwich of two graham crackers, toasted marshmallow and ½ chocolate bar". A 1957 Betty Crocker cookbook contains a similar recipe under the name "s'mores". 

The 1958 publication Intramural and Recreational Sports for High School and College makes reference to "marshmallow toasts" and "s'mores hikes" as does its related predecessor, Intramural and Recreational Sports for Men and Women, published in 1949.

Preparation
S'mores are traditionally cooked over a campfire, although they can also be made at home over the flame of a wood-burning fireplace, in an oven, over a stove's flame, in a microwave, with a s'mores-making kit, or in a panini press. A marshmallow, usually held by a metal or wooden skewer, is heated over the fire until it is golden brown. Traditionally, the marshmallow is gooey but not burnt, but, depending on individual preference and cooking time, marshmallows can range from barely warm to charred. The roasted marshmallow is then sandwiched between two halves of a graham cracker and a piece of chocolate (or with chocolate on both top and bottom), between the graham crackers. An additional step may follow, wherein the entire sandwich is wrapped in foil and heated so that the chocolate partially melts. 

Various confections containing graham cracker, chocolate, and marshmallow are often sold as some derivative of a s'more, but they are not necessarily heated or served in the same shape as the traditional s'mores. The Hershey's S'mores bar is one example. Kellogg's Pop-Tarts also feature a s'mores variety. In the UK, the lack of graham crackers is easily improvised with digestive biscuits with a slab of Cadbury's chocolate. Chocolate digestives has a major advantage when lacking a piece of chocolate. Contemporary recipes can substitute other foods, such as potato chips, Nutella and Peeps, for the classic ingredients.

Gallery

See also

 Banana boat (food)
 Choco pie
 Mallomars
 Moon pie
 Nanaimo bar
 S'mores Grahams
 Smorz

References

External links

Stuffed Puffs: Marshmallows made for S'mores

Chocolate desserts
Marshmallows
Snack foods
American cuisine
American desserts
Food and drink introduced in 1925
Independence Day (United States) foods
Canadian cuisine
Canadian desserts